Ryan MacDonald (born 24 February 1978), also known by the nicknames of "Butch" and "Ginge", is an English former rugby league footballer who played in the 1990s, 2000s and 2010s.

Background
Ryan MacDonald was born in Cumbria, England.

References

External links
Whitehaven profile 

1978 births
Living people
Batley Bulldogs players
Bramley RLFC players
Cumbria rugby league team players
Dewsbury Rams players
English people of Scottish descent
English rugby league players
Halifax R.L.F.C. players
Leeds Rhinos players
London Skolars players
Newcastle Thunder players
North Wales Crusaders players
Rugby league players from Cumbria
Rugby league props
Scotland national rugby league team players
Whitehaven R.L.F.C. players
Widnes Vikings players
Workington Town players
York City Knights players